Lady Sarashina is an opera in nine tableaux by Hungarian composer Péter Eötvös to a libretto by Mari Mezei, based on As I crossed a Bridge of Dreams, fragments of an 11th-century diary (Japan, 1008) by Takasue's daughter, also known as Lady Sarashina. It premiered on 4 March 2008 at the Opéra National de Lyon. The opera is the result of a commission by the opera in Lyon; it was broadcast in full on France Musique on 27 September 2008.

Libretto
Lady Sarashina lived in Japan in the eleventh century, a time of high civilization where Japanese women held an essential role in social, economic and cultural life. She is the author of a classic piece in Japanese literature, The Journal of Sarashina. In her diary, she writes about her love of Japanese nature and landscapes, describes the sites she visits, the pilgrimages, dreams and monologues about life and death.
In the opera, Lady Sarashina narrates her life. All the other roles are portrayed by three other singers, the Vocal Trio.

Roles

The staging was a co-production with the Théâtre national de l'opéra-comique, where it was staged in February 2009.
In April 2013, the same production was mounted by the Polish National Opera in Teatr Wielki, Warsaw.

Instrumentation
The instrumentation calls for:
2 fl (both + Piccolo, second + altfl.), 1 ob (+ Eng.horn), 3 clar. (third + basscl.), 
2 bassoon (second + contrabassoon), 1 sax (S-A-T-Bar), 
Winds: 3 - 2- 3- 1, 2 percussion, 1 harp, 1 sampler keyboard
Strings: 6 - 5 - 4 - 3 - 2

Critical reception
In 2008, the opera received the prestigious Prix du Syndicat de la critique for Best Musical Creation.
The world premiere drew wide international attention from the press. Reviews ranged from favorable to triumphant.

References

External links
 Opéra comique Paris website – extensive background
 Peter Eötvös compositions - Lady Sarashina

Operas by Peter Eötvös
2008 operas
Operas
Operas set in Japan
Japan in non-Japanese culture